Tripoli Lake is located within the Lake Superior drainage basin in Algoma District, northeastern Ontario, Canada. The Canadian Pacific Railway transcontinental main line passes at the southwest tip of the lake.

The primary inflow is an unnamed creek from West Tripoli Lake, and the primary outflow is an unnamed creek to Tripoli Creek, which flows via the Magpie River into Lake Superior.

See also
List of lakes in Ontario

References

Lakes of Algoma District